Sergio Ortega Alvarado (February 2, 1938 – September 15, 2003) was a Chilean composer and pianist.

Biography 

Ortega was born in Antofagasta, Chile. He studied composition with Roberto Falabella and with Gustavo Becerra-Schmidt in the National Conservatory at the University of Chile. After graduating, he worked in the Institute of Musical Extension and was a sound engineer for six years in the university's experimental theater, Teatro Antonio Varas.

Ortega was a force for the leftist movement in Chile. Not only did he compose President Salvador Allende's electoral theme song, "Venceremos" (We shall triumph), he was also the author of the worldwide anthem of popular resistance, "¡El pueblo unido, jamás será vencido!" (The people united will never be defeated!). He was also the composer of the anthems of the Partido Radical (Radical Party), the Juventudes Comunistas (Communist Youth), and the Brazilian Central Única dos Trabalhadores (United Workers' Central). He also turned Salvador Allende's political plan, embodied in the texts of Julio Rojas, into an album of songs called Canto al Programa, performed by Inti-Illimani.

Ortega composed some of the seminal works of the movement known as the Nueva Canción Chilena (New Chilean Song), a fusion of rhythms and styles with a social conscience. In his work, one can find poems, cantatas, operas, songs, and soundtracks. Among his most famous works are the songs "El monte y el río" (The mountain and the river, lyrics by Nicolás Guillén), and "Les deux mers" (The two seas), and a trilogy about the French Revolution.

Ortega composed a fair number of songs for use in the theater, one of his last works being the opera of fellow communist Pablo Neruda's epic poem Fulgor y muerte de Joaquín Murieta (Brilliance and Death of Joaquín Murieta). He also worked on a musical version of Neruda's Canto General with Gustavo Becerra, which was staged in 1970. In 1978, Ortega wrote a cantata of Neruda's "Bernardo O'Higgins Riquelme, 1810. Poema sonoro para el padre de mi patria" ("Homage to the Father of my Country"), for the liberator of Chile. Ortega worked with his eldest son, Chanaral Ortega, on an operatic version of Pedro Páramo, the novel by Mexican writer Juan Rulfo.

In 1969, Ortega became a professor of composition in the Conservatory. In his classes and master classes in composition took part: Gustavo Baez, Mirtru Escalona-Mijares, Adolfo Kaplan, Sergey Kutanin, Arthur Lavilla, Clem Mounkala, Chañaral Ortega-Miranda, Martin Pavlovsky, Claire-Melanie Sinnhuber and others. In 1970, he began to direct the university's TV station, Channel 9, which he continued until 1973. At the end of 1973, after the September 11 coup, Ortega fled to France, where he resided until his death. In 1978 Ortega visited the USSR, participated in the festival "Red Carnation". He was given permission to return to Chile in 1983, and did so several times. During his exile, Ortega directed L'Ecole Nationale de Musique, in Pantin, France.

Ortega died of cancer at the age of 65 on September 15, 2003 in Paris, four days after the 30th anniversary of the coup d'etat. His remains were repatriated to Chile.

1938 births
2003 deaths
Chilean activists
Chilean composers
Chilean male composers
Chilean Marxists
Chilean socialists
Male musical theatre composers
Nueva canción musicians
People from Antofagasta
Deaths from cancer in France
Chilean pianists
20th-century pianists
Male pianists
20th-century male musicians